Daniel David Dickau (born September 16, 1978) is an American former professional basketball player who currently works as an on-air broadcaster for ESPN, the Pac-12 Network, CBS Sports Network and Westwood One. He is also a co-host of the Dickau and Slim Show on Spokane's 700 ESPN with Sean "Slim" Widmer.

Early life and college
Born in Portland, Oregon, Dickau graduated from Prairie High School in nearby Brush Prairie, Washington. He enrolled at the University of Washington in Seattle in 1997 and played for the Huskies under head coach Bob Bender. Dickau fractured his heel 13 games into the 1998–99 season and announced his decision to transfer in April.

He enrolled at Gonzaga University in Spokane and sat out the 1999–2000 season as a transfer, a de facto redshirt year. He was a standout point guard for the Bulldogs for two seasons under head coach Mark Few, named a first team All-American his senior year in 2002.

NBA career

Player 
Dickau was selected in the first round of the 2002 NBA draft by the Sacramento Kings, the 28th overall pick. He was traded eight times and wore various jersey numbers in his six-year NBA career:

to the Atlanta Hawks (#12) on June 26, 2002 (on draft night for a first-round pick);
to the Portland Trail Blazers (#7) on February 9, 2004 (Rasheed Wallace trade);
to the Golden State Warriors (#10) on July 20, 2004 (Nick Van Exel trade);
to the Dallas Mavericks (#21) on August 24, 2004 (Erick Dampier trade);
to the New Orleans Hornets (#2) on December 3, 2004 (Darrell Armstrong trade);
to the Boston Celtics (#20) on October 1, 2005 (New Orleans received a second-round draft pick);
to the Portland Trail Blazers (for a second time, via a trade involving former teammate Theo Ratliff) (#2) on June 28, 2006 and
to the New York Knicks (#1) on June 28, 2007 (Zach Randolph and Steve Francis trade).

For two years in a row, Dickau was traded in a draft-day trade package, first from the Celtics to the Trail Blazers, then from the Trail Blazers to the Knicks.

Dickau's best season came in 2004–05 with the New Orleans Hornets, where he saw significant playing time and led the team in total assists, total steals, and 3-pointers made. During the season, he scored 20 or more points in seven games and had five double-doubles.

On December 17, 2005, as a member of the Celtics, his season was ended by a ruptured Achilles tendon sustained while playing against the Chicago Bulls.  At the time, he was averaging 3.3 points per game and 2.1 assists per game. On June 28, 2006, the Celtics traded Dickau, center Raef LaFrentz and the 7th pick in the 2006 NBA draft to the Trail Blazers for center Theo Ratliff and guard Sebastian Telfair. Dickau was then sent to the Knicks along with Randolph, only to be waived when the Knicks acquired Jared Jordan. Two days later, Dickau signed with the Clippers.

On October 1, 2008, Dickau signed with the Golden State Warriors. Terms of the agreement were not disclosed per team policy. He played in two preseason games. Against the Portland Trail Blazers on October 8, Dickau played 21 minutes and scored 8 points and grabbed 5 rebounds.  On October 19, 2008, Dickau was waived by the Warriors. On September 23, 2009, Dickau accepted an invitation to the Phoenix Suns training camp. He was waived by the Suns on October 21. With the Suns, Dickau played in five preseason games.

Dickau's final regular season NBA game was played on April 16th, 2008 in a 75–93 loss to the Houston Rockets where he recorded 2 points, 1 assist and 1 rebound.

Dickau signed with the Fort Wayne Mad Ants on February 16, 2010.

Coach 
Before the beginning of the 2011–12 season, Dickau was hired by the Trail Blazers as a player development assistant.

International career
On August 12, 2008, Dickau signed with Air Avellino of the Italian League.  Dickau and the team agreed to terminate his contract on September 29, 2008. he joined the Brose Baskets of the German Basketball Bundesliga in January 2009.

NBA career statistics

Regular season

|-
| align="left" | 2002–03
| align="left" | Atlanta
| 50 || 0 || 10.3 || .412 || .361 || .808 || .9 || 1.7 || .3 || .0 || 3.7
|-
| align="left" | 2003–04
| align="left" | Atlanta
| 23 || 0 || 6.2 || .429 || .300 || .667 || .7 || .8 || .4 || .0 || 2.1
|-
| align="left" | 2003–04
| align="left" | Portland
| 20 || 0 || 7.6 || .327 || .350 || .875 || .5 || 1.0 || .4 || .0 || 2.3
|-
| align="left" | 2004–05
| align="left" | Dallas
| 4 || 0 || 4.0 || .125 || .333 || .667 || .3 || .3 || .0 || .0 || 1.3
|-
| align="left" | 2004–05
| align="left" | New Orleans
| 67 || 46 || 31.0 || .408 || .347 || .836 || 2.7 || 5.2 || 1.1 || .1 || 13.2
|-
| align="left" | 2005–06
| align="left" | Boston
| 19 || 0 || 12.3 || .370 || .500 || 1.000 || .8 || 2.1 || .6 || .1 || 3.3
|-
| align="left" | 2006–07
| align="left" | Portland
| 50 || 3 || 8.9 || .358 || .262 || .792 || .9 || 1.4 || .3 || .0 || 3.3
|-
| align="left" | 2007–08
| align="left" | L.A. Clippers
| 67 || 8 || 15.5 || .419 || .333 || .829 || 1.4 || 2.6 || .5 || .0 || 5.3
|- class="sortbottom"
| align="center" colspan="2"| Career
| 300 || 57 || 15.4 || .401 || .341 || .831 || 1.4 || 2.5 || .5 || .0 || 5.8

Personal life
Dickau is a Christian.  Dickau and his wife Heather married in the fall of 2002 and have 7 children (2 boys and 5 girls).

References

External links
 
Dan Dickau expanded profile at NBA.com

Dan Dickau Basketball – Official Dan Dickau webpage
Dan Dickau Basketball Academy
Basketpedya.com Player Profile

1978 births
Living people
All-American college men's basketball players
American expatriate basketball people in Germany
American men's basketball players
Atlanta Hawks players
Basketball players from Washington (state)
Basketball players from Portland, Oregon
Boston Celtics players
Brose Bamberg players
College basketball announcers in the United States
Dallas Mavericks players
Fort Wayne Mad Ants players
Gonzaga Bulldogs men's basketball players
Los Angeles Clippers players
Medalists at the 2001 Summer Universiade
New Orleans Hornets players
Point guards
Portland Trail Blazers players
Sacramento Kings draft picks
Sportspeople from Vancouver, Washington
Universiade bronze medalists for the United States
Universiade medalists in basketball
Washington Huskies men's basketball players